The Washburn University School of Law is a public law school located on the main campus of Washburn University in Topeka, Kansas. Washburn Law was founded in 1903. The school is accredited by the American Bar Association and has been a member of the Association of American Law Schools since 1905.

Centers and programs 
 Business and Transactional Law Center
 Children and Family Law Center
 Center for Excellence in Advocacy
 Center for Law and Government
 Center for Oil and Gas Law
 Center for International and Comparative Law

The Washburn Law Clinic functions as an in-house general practice law firm, providing representation in practice concentration areas such as Children and Family Law, Criminal Defense, State Tribal Court Practice, Civil Litigation, Criminal Appellate Advocacy, and Small Business and Transactional Law.

Under Washburn Law's Third Year Anywhere Enrollment Option, selected students can extern in the geographic area where they plan to practice after graduation (subject to limitations based on student safety and educational integrity).

Publications 
 The Washburn Law Journal
 Washburn Lawyer
 Washburn Agricultural Law and Tax Report

Curriculum 

The first-year curriculum includes Legal Analysis, Research, and Writing, Civil Procedure, Contracts, Criminal Law, Torts, Constitutional Law, and Property Law. All entering students participate in the law school's academic support program designed to teach law students the law school learning strategies they need to succeed.

Employment 
According to Washburns's official 2020 ABA-required disclosures, 79.6% of the Class of 2020 obtained full-time, long-term, JD-required employment within ten months of graduation. Washburns's Law School Transparency under-employment score is 13.3%, indicating the percentage of the Class of 2020 unemployed, pursuing an additional degree, or working in a non-professional, short-term, or part-time job nine months after graduation.

Costs 
The total cost of attendance (indicating the cost of tuition, fees, and living expenses) at Washburn for the 2020-21 academic year is $41,327 for residents of Kansas, Colorado, Missouri, Texas, Oklahoma, and Nebraska and $54,377 for residents of other states not previously mentioned. The Law School Transparency estimated debt-financed cost of attendance for three years is $128,387 for residents of Kansas/Colorado/Missouri/Texas/Oklahoma/Nebraska and $170,812 for residents of other states not previously mentioned.

Notable alumni 

 Alex M. Fromme, Justice of the Kansas Supreme Court
 William A. Smith, Justice of the Kansas Supreme Court

References

External links 
 

Washburn University
Educational institutions established in 1903
Law schools in Kansas
1903 establishments in Kansas